Kilmarnock railway viaduct, known locally as The Viaduct, is a railway viaduct crossing the town centre of Kilmarnock, and was constructed between 1843–1850. The bridge begins at Kilmarnock railway station and leads to destinations in England. It is a most distinctive feature of the town centre with 23 masonry arches and defines the northern boundary of the town centre. It was built in the 1840s to enable the Glasgow – Kilmarnock line to continue to Carlisle. 

The structure is a Category B listed building and is owned by Historic Environment Scotland.

History 
The 23 arch railway viaduct was designed by John Miller and Thomas Grainger for the Glasgow, Paisley, Kilmarnock and Ayr Railway and built over the period 1843 to 1850.  It enabled the railway to extend south towards Carlisle for connections to other locations in England.  The viaduct begins at Kilmarnock railway station and continues over the Kilmarnock Water, leading to the south end of Kay Park.

In 2008, the viaduct had blue uplighters installed (matching the colour of the local football team Kilmarnock F.C.), and in 2019, a £213,000 upgrade with multi-coloured LEDs took place. This allowed for the circuits to be controlled above the ground and were wired in parallel, which allows individual lamps to be replaced when necessary.

Incidents and accidents
In April 2012, the bridge's safety had to be upgraded after a man was seriously injured after jumping 40 ft from the top of the railway viaduct.

In February 2021, a stabbing occurred at the viaduct when a 24 year old female was stabbed in Portland Street. The viaduct and surrounding area was cornered off by Police Scotland officers with forensic detectives carrying out investigations of the scene, with the area remaining closed to the public into the following day.

References

External links
 

Railway bridges in Scotland
Buildings and structures in Kilmarnock
Category B listed buildings in East Ayrshire
Listed bridges in Scotland
Viaducts in Scotland